Algernon Maudslay CBE (10 January 1873 – 2 March 1948) was a British sailor who represented his country at the 1900 Summer Olympics in Meulan, France. With Lorne Currie as helmsman and fellow crewmember John Gretton and Linton Hope, Maudslay took 1st place in the race of the .5 to 1 ton.

Personal life
Maudslay was born in Tetbury, Gloucestershire the son of Herbert and Marion Maudslay, his father was an engineer.

Professional life
 In 1917 Maudslay, as honorary secretary of the Belgian War Refugees Committee was appointed a Commander of the Order of the British Empire.
 In 1927 Maudslay was appointed a Grand Officer of the Order of the Crown of Belgium in recognition of valuable services.
 He was later a member of the council of the British Red Cross Society.

Further reading

References

External links

1873 births
1948 deaths
British male sailors (sport)
Sailors at the 1900 Summer Olympics – .5 to 1 ton
Sailors at the 1900 Summer Olympics – Open class
Olympic sailors of Great Britain
English Olympic medallists
Olympic gold medallists for Great Britain
Commanders of the Order of the British Empire
Grand Officers of the Order of the Crown (Belgium)
Medalists at the 1900 Summer Olympics
Olympic medalists in sailing